Interstate 84 (I-84) is a part of the Interstate Highway System that links Portland, Oregon, to I-80 near Echo, Utah. The  segment in the US state of Utah is the shortest of any of the three states the western I-84 passes through and contains the eastern terminus of the highway. I-84 enters Box Elder County near Snowville before becoming concurrent with I-15 in Tremonton. The concurrent highways travel south through Brigham City and Ogden and separate near Ogden-Hinckley Airport. Turing east along the Davis County border, I-84 intersects US Route 89 (US-89) and enters Weber Canyon as well as Morgan County. While in Morgan County, I-84 passes the Devil's Gate-Weber Hydroelectric Power Plant and Devil's Slide rock formation. Past Morgan, the highway crosses into Summit County, past the Thousand Mile Tree before reaching its eastern terminus at I-80 near Echo.

Construction of the controlled-access highway was scheduled in late 1957 under the designations Interstate 82S (I-82S) and Interstate 80N (I-80N). The I-82S designation was only applied on paper for about a year, but the I-80N designation was the highway's official designation until 1977 when it was renumbered I-84 by the American Association of State Highway and Transportation Officials (AASHTO). By 1986, construction of the freeway had been completed across the three states. Average traffic in 2012, along the non-concurrent parts of I-84, ranged from as few as 6,655 vehicles traveling along I-84 at the interchange with State Route 86 (SR-86) in Henefer, and as many as 18,945 vehicles used the highway at the SR-26 interchange in Riverdale.

Route description
Out of the three states that the western portion of I-84 passes through, the  segment in Utah is the shortest. By comparison, the longest stretch of western I-84 through a single state is the  segment in Oregon. I-84 also has a noncontiguous eastern segment that passes through Pennsylvania, New York, Connecticut, and Massachusetts: all four of these segments are shorter than the Utah segment.

Every year, the Utah Department of Transportation (UDOT) conducts a series of surveys on its highways in the state to measure traffic volume. This is expressed in terms of annual average daily traffic (AADT), a measure of traffic volume for any average day of the year. In 2012, UDOT calculated that as few as 6,655 vehicles traveled I-84 at the interchange with SR-86 in Henefer, and as many as 18,945 vehicles used the highway at the SR-26 interchange in Riverdale. Between 27 and 57 percent of the traffic recorded consisted of trucks. These counts are of the portion of the freeway in Utah and are not reflective of the entire Interstate or of its concurrency with I-15. As part of the Interstate Highway System, the entire route is listed on the National Highway System, a system of roads that are important to the nation's economy, defense, and mobility.

Western segment
Crossing the Idaho–Utah state line, I-84 enters Box Elder County and the Curlew Valley near farmland that utilizes center-pivot irrigation before intersecting SR-30 at a diamond interchange. The town of Snowville is crossed before passing to the north of the Hansel Mountains and the North Promontory Mountains. The town of Howell, accessible from an interchange with SR-83, lays to the southeast of Blue Creek Reservoir in the Blue Creek Valley. Access to Golden Spike National Historical Park is provided by SR-83 south of Howell. The Blue Spring Hills form the southern border of Howell as I-84 continues southeast. Additional center irrigation farmland is passed before giving way to more traditional farmland outside of the city of Tremonton, where a trumpet interchange marks where I-15 turns north towards Malad City and Pocatello.

Concurrency with I-15

Concurrent highways I-15/I-84 continue south, parallel to rail belonging to the Union Pacific Railroad past the Wellsville Mountain Wilderness, to an interchange at 1100 West in Brigham City, also known as US-91, which, once in Brigham City, becomes concurrent with US-89 and the two highways travel northeast from Brigham City into Box Elder Canyon toward Logan in the heart of the Cache Valley. US-89 closely parallels I-15/I-84 east, as the highways pass Willard Bay, Willard Bay State Park, and Bear River Migratory Bird Refuge before crossing into Weber County.

Upon entering Weber County, the rail line that the highway has paralleled since Tremonton splits off eastward near Defense Depot Ogden, as the concurrent highways continue south past Farr West and Marriott-Slaterville before a Southern Pacific Railroad rail line, which traverses the Great Salt Lake on a causeway, crosses under the freeway. The city of Ogden is bypassed by the Interstates, with US-89 serving downtown. US-89 is accessible via interchanges with SR-39, SR-79, and SR-104 in addition to I-84 further southeast. I-84 splits from I-15 at the south end of Ogden-Hinckley Airport, with I-15 continuing south toward Salt Lake City and Provo.

Eastern segment

Splitting from I-15 near Roy, I-84 passes between Hill Air Force Base, which is to the south of the highway, and Washington Terrace before clipping the extreme northern portions of Davis County. While in Davis County, I-84 intersects 475 East, also known as the Adams Avenue Parkway, before coming to a hybrid partial cloverleaf/half diamond interchange with US-89 along the Davis–Weber county line.

I-84 follows the Weber River into Weber Canyon, Morgan County, and Wasatch–Cache National Forest. Once in the canyon, the carriageways of the highway split to accommodate the Devil's Gate-Weber Hydroelectric Power Plant. Following the river south, I-84 exits the forest and enters the county seat of Morgan. Leaving the city the highway turns back east, passing Devil's Slide, an unusual rock formation just off the freeway.

The tree was said to be the only pine tree between Omaha and Salt Lake City. Another tree was planted as the original tree had died in 1900 and was removed in 1926 to during the conversion from single-track to double-track through the canyon. Past the tree, the freeway passes through the town of Henefer before terminating at a directional T interchange with I-80 just south of the census-designated place of Echo. Immediately south of the interchange is Echo Reservoir and Echo Dam.

History

Earlier roads
Most of the original routing of what is now I-84 existed as early as 1923; however, the portion of now I-84 into Idaho was not yet constructed. In 1926, much of the route was signed as US-30S, from the now eastern terminus at I-80 (US-530 then), northwest into Ogden. Between Ogden and Brigham City, the highway was to be concurrent with US-91, then US-30S split off northwest to the Idaho border. The entire western branch of US-30S was an unimproved road; however, the concurrency into Ogden was paved. The remainder of the route to its now terminus was mostly graded with a few improved sections, and, by 1937, the entire route was paved.

Current road
The first Utah state route to have the number 84 is what is now known as SR-126. SR-126 was originally numbered SR-84 until the 1977 Utah state route renumbering. Previously, the freeway's legislative designation was SR-3. Like the other two main Interstate Highways in Utah, I-15 (Veterans Memorial Highway) and I-80 (Purple Heart Trail), I-84 has also been given a special name of "Vietnam Veterans Memorial Highway". House Bill HB275, sponsored by Utah Representative Justin Fawson, North Ogden, authorizing the name designation was signed into law by Utah Governor Gary Herbert on March 30, 2015. The highway loosely follows the path of the first transcontinental railroad. The original routing of US-30S had the highway passing into Idaho west of Black Pine Peak; however, the new I-84 was constructed to the east. The original roadways are now numbered SR-30, SR-42 and Idaho State Highway 2847.

Passage of the Federal-Aid Highway Act of 1956 formed the Interstate Highway System; however, only the western segment of now I-84 was approved at this time, and a designation of I-82S was assigned to a then unconstructed controlled-access highway across Box Elder County in 1957. The eastern segment of the highway was added later in 1957, and the route was numbered I-80N by 1958. By 1968, portions of the western half of the freeway had been completed, along with the segment between Tremonton and Brigham City. A portion of the freeway was completed around Morgan as well. By 1971, most of the western portions of the freeway had been constructed with two sections remaining that had at-grade intersections. Along the concurrency, there were gaps between Brigham City and Pleasant View and one small gap near the Devil's Slide.

The I-80N designation was changed to I-84 in 1977 by the AASHTO, over objections from the Washington State Department of Transportation and the Idaho Transportation Department, and with the support of UDOT and the Oregon Department of Transportation. By 1978, construction of I-84 was complete across most of the three states.

In 1994, I-84 was planned to be used to transport low-level radioactive waste from Idaho National Laboratory to the Waste Isolation Pilot Plant in Carlsbad, New Mexico, via Wyoming. This did not start until 1999 however due to the delay in the opening of the New Mexican plant. A $20-million (equivalent to $ in ) reconstruction of the US-89 interchange at the mouth of Weber Canyon was financed partly by the funding obtained by the state in preparation for the 2002 Winter Olympics in 1998 and was scheduled to begin in 2000. Reconstruction of a  segment of I-84 between Mountain Green and Morgan was done between 2004 and 2005 at a cost of $19 million (equivalent to $ in ). One of the sub-contractors on the job was found guilty of lying about sub-par work done on installation of roadside impact absorbers along this stretch.

Exit list

See also

References

External links

Interstate 84 in Utah on AARoads

84
 Utah
Transportation in Box Elder County, Utah
Transportation in Weber County, Utah
Transportation in Davis County, Utah
Transportation in Morgan County, Utah
Transportation in Summit County, Utah
Central Overland Route
U.S. Route 30S